Maret School is a coeducational, K–12 independent school in Washington, D.C. It was founded by Marthe Maret in 1911 as a French primary school for girls and boys.

History
In the late 1800s and early 1900s, three French sisters, Mlles Marthe, Louise, and Jeanne Maret, left their home in the village of Marignan (Sciez) in France close by Geneva, Switzerland to teach. Louise taught in Russia, Jeanne in the Philippines, and Marthe (who became blind at age 18), in Washington, D.C.

By 1911, Louise and Jeanne had joined Marthe in Washington, where they were inspired to bring an international flavor to education. They founded the Maret French School, later named Maret School. In 1923, the sisters moved the school to 2118 Kalorama Road with an enrollment of 62 culturally diverse students.

By 1950, Margaret Williams had joined the school, which she led for the next 18 years. In 1952, growing enrollment compelled the School's Board of Trustees to secure a larger campus at 3000 Cathedral Avenue, NW. In 1953, boys were admitted to the Upper School. By 1966, enrollment totaled 375 students.

Maret School was led by three headmasters throughout the late 1960s and early 1970s: William Laxner, William Layton, and John Francis. Starting in the mid 1970s, Peter A. Sturtevant Sr. led Maret for two decades. To accommodate a growing enrollment, the school added additional facilities for athletics, arts, and academics.

Marjo Talbott replaced Sturtevant as headmaster in 1994.

Student body
Forty percent of Maret's 635 students identify as students of color. Students are from 45 nations and 24% of students receive financial aid.

Notable alumni

 Peter Matthew Bauer: Musician
 Sean Davis: Professional football player for the Pittsburgh Steelers
Anthony Dobbins: Professional basketball player and coach
Luka Garza: Professional basketball player for the Minnesota Timberwolves
 Sonja Lyubomirsky: Professor in the Department of Psychology at the University of California, Riverside and the author of The How of Happiness
 J. Lorand Matory: Anthropology Professor at Duke University
 Christof Putzel: Journalist
 Theodore Shapiro: American composer best known for film scores, including State and Main, 13 Going on 30, Along Came Polly, The Devil Wears Prada, Fun with Dick and Jane, etc.
Yeardley Smith: Actress best known for voicing Lisa Simpson on The Simpsons
 Josh Stamberg: Actor
 Rosalind Wiseman: Author of New York Times best-selling book Queen Bees and Wannabes: Helping Your Daughter Survive Cliques, Gossip, Boyfriends, and Other Realities of Adolescence, released in 2002, was the basis of the 2004 film Mean Girls.
 Dan van Holst Pellekaan: Deputy Premier of South Australia 
 Catie Lazarus: Entertainer/Writer

References

1911 establishments in Washington, D.C.
Educational institutions established in 1911
Private elementary schools in Washington, D.C.
Private high schools in Washington, D.C.
Private middle schools in Washington, D.C.